Athorybia lucida is a species of siphonophores in the family Agalmatidae.

References 

Agalmatidae
Animals described in 1978